Snow grass is a common name for several plants and may refer to:

Danthonia species in New Zealand
Phippsia concinna
Poa species in Australia, including:
Poa sieberiana